David Lindo  is a British [man] and author. Also known as the Urban Birder, he is a regular contributor to Bird Watching magazine and has written a number of books including The Urban Birder, published in 2011 and How to be an Urban Birder, published in 2014. More recent publications include a book for children, The Extraordinary World of Birds, published in 2022. He is a vice-president of the Wildfowl & Wetlands Trust. He is a regular guest presenter on BBC Radio 4's Tweet of the Day, where he has spoken about the osprey, European robin and common kestrel and has also made appearances on TV shows such as Countryfile, The One Show and The Alan Titchmarsh Show. He launched a campaign in 2015 to find Britain's national 
n 224,000 votes being cast, the robin was declared the winner, beating the barn owl and the common blackbird.

Lindo has been named by BBC Wildlife Magazine as one of the most influential people in wildlife. In 2021, the Linnean Society of London presented Lindo with the H. H. Bloomer Award, given to an amateur naturalist deemed to have made "an important contribution to the knowledge of natural history".

Early life

He grew up in north-west London.

Bibliography
The Urban Birder (2011) 
How to be an Urban Birder (2014) 
Tales from Concrete Jungles: Urban Birding Around the World (2015) 
The Extraordinary World of Birds (2022) ISBN 9780744050080

References

Birdwatchers
British nature writers
Year of birth missing (living people)
Living people